Abdullah Numan (Serbian Cyrillic: Абдулах Нуман; born 1950) (also spelled Abdullah Nu'man) is a Serbian-Australian academic and Islamic cleric currently serving as Mufti of Serbia.

Biography 
Born in Belgrade, SR Serbia in 1950 as Ivan Trifunović into a Serbian Orthodox family. Trifunović first encountered an Arab Muslim exchange student in Belgrade's Republic Square in 1969 who lent him money. This experience and love of the counter-culture inspired Trifunović and four friends to explore the orient, boarding a train first to Istanbul, reaching Nepal before they had depleted their funds. His friends returned home, whilst Trifunović having been deported from Nepal, embarked on a six-month journey throughout India. During his travels Trifunović underwent an Islamic conversion in Rajasthan, where he was conferred the Muslim name Abdullah Numan.

Upon his returned from India, Numan encountered opposition to his conversion to Islam from family members, though his aunt and actress, Ružica Sokić did support his right to practice his faith and encouraged her nephews spiritual development. Numan began attending Bajraki Mosque soon befriending the Mufti of Serbia, Hamdija Jusufspahić, who appointed him as his personal secretary, thus becoming his primary mentor.

Once competing compulsory military service in 1975, Numan married Razija, an Australian from Melbourne whom he had met in Belgrade. The couple relocate to Melbourne where Numan completed four university diplomas in: Islamic studies, Philosophy, Sociology and Business Management. He completed his postgraduate studies at the University of Melbourne in 1982 with the topic "Understanding God and His Names and Properties in Islamic Theology from Hassan al-Basri to Ghazali", later completing his doctoral dissertation on "The Concept of the Individual and Community in Islam".

Numan worked as a university lecturer in Australia before returning to Serbia. In June 2016 the Supreme Assembly of the Islamic Community of Serbia convened in Novi Pazar. Following a schism in the community the entire Riyaset of Serbia, headed by Reis-ul-ulema (Grand Mufti) Adem Zilkić, was dismissed. Sead Nasufović was appointed the new Reis-ul-ulema, whilst Numan was appointed to serve a five-year term as the Mufti of Serbia replacing Muhamed Jusufspahić.

References 

1950 births
Living people
Muftis
People from Belgrade